Akavoor Narayanan was a Malayalam language writer, scholar and critic from Kerala, India. His most important work is Venmani Prasthanam, which is a study on the nineteenth century Malayalam poetry movement known as Venmani Movement. He has authored more than twenty books, including three Aattakkathas.

Biography
Narayanan Nampoothirippad was born in 1929 at Akavoor Mana in Vellarapilly, Aluva of present-day Ernakulam district. As a child he studied Vedas and Sanskrit. After passing intermediate at Union Christian College, Aluva, degree in chemistry from University College, Thiruvananthapuram and post graduate degree in Malayalam literature with first class, he became Malayalam lecturer at Sree Kerala Varma College, Thrissur and worked there for nine years. Then in 1968, he became a lecturer of Malayalam in the Department of Modern Languages at the University of Delhi and continued there till he retired in 1994.

Narayanan has written reviews of Malayalam books in the Hindu daily since 1950. He has also written several articles and books on Kathakali. He has also served as chairman of the International Center for Kathakali and editor of Pranavam magazine. He was appointed Malayalam Sub Editor of the Directorate of Audio Visual Publicity in Delhi in 1961 and later became the Malayalam Editor of the Indian Council for Agricultural Research (ICAR). Narayanan, who was a member of the Malayalam language advisory board of several institutions including Aligarh University, Punjab University, UPSC, CBSE and UGC, was also served as advisor at the Civil Service Training Academy in Mussoorie.

Personal life and death
He and his wife Gowri Antharjanam have 3 children. He died on 2 December 2009 at New Delhi.

Works

 Essays

Kavi Kokilam (attakkatha)
Uthara Ramayanam (attakkatha)
Sreeramodantham
Krishi Bodhini
 (translation)
Perspectives (essays in English)

 (memoirs)

Awards and honors
Kerala Sahithya Akademi Endowment Award 2005 for Akavoorinte Lokam

References

1929 births
2009 deaths
Malayalam-language writers
Indian literary critics
People from Ernakulam district
20th-century Indian male writers
University College Thiruvananthapuram alumni